The Hanyang HY4260 is a model of military tractor trucks developed, produced and used by the People's Republic of China. These vehicles are primarily used to mount Beijing's ballistic missile family and are used in conjunction with other transporter erector launchers, to further bolster China's ballistic missile capabilities.

Likewise, its much larger sibling truck, the Hanyang HY4330, is able to carry DF-31 (both DF-31A and DF-31B variants) intercontinental ballistic missiles, and functions in a similar nature to conventional TELs.

Description

The Hanyang HY4260 is a model 6x6 tractor truck produced and developed by the Hanyang Special Purpose Vehicle Institute. Like other Chinese TELs such as the WS2600, the HY4260 primarily carries the DF-21 intermediate range ballistic missile, which is towed on the back on a semi-trailer. Due to its Deutz BF12L413F turbocharged diesel engine, the HY4260 could tow semi-trailers with a weight ranging from 50-75 tons in weight.

It transports these ballistic missiles from their shelters and storage bases to the launch sites. Due to its high mobility, the HY4260 could leave its base of storage and operate in remote areas on high alert, greatly increasing the difficulty in being detected by hostile forces.

Although the HY4260 has off-road capabilities, it is primarily designed to operate on hard conventional surface roads.

See also
WS2300
WS2400
WS2500
WS2600
HTF5680A1
Hanyang HY4330

References

Military trucks of China
Military vehicles of the People's Republic of China